The Upper Palatine Hills (also Oberpfälzisches Hügel- und Bergland or Oberpfälzer Bruchschollenland) is a Hercynian range of rolling hills (Hügelland) and valleys running from the Upper Palatine-Bavarian Forest in the (north-)east and the Franconian Jura in the (south-)west. It lies mostly within the Bavarian province of Upper Palatinate, hence the name. The range, which is oriented northwest to southeast, is about 100 kilometres long, but only between 7 and 35 kilometres wide and covers and area of 2,000 km². The best known settlements are (from northwest to southeast) Weiden (Ostrand), Amberg and Schwandorf.

Sources and external links 
 BfN landscape fact files:
 Upper Palatine Hills
 Grafenwöhr Training Area
 Naab valley between Wernberg and Maxhütte (only partly in the Upper Palatine Hills)

! Upper Palatine Hills
Hill ranges of Bavaria
Upper Palatinate
Bayreuth (district)